1997 Punjab Legislative Assembly election for the constitution of the Eleventh Legislative Assembly of Punjab was held in the Indian state of Punjab.

The term of the tenth Punjab assembly  ended with its dissolution on 11 March 1996. The dissolution was necessitated after the results of the election was declared.

Composition

By alliance

By party 

|- align=center
!style="background-color:#E9E9E9" class="unsortable"|
!style="background-color:#E9E9E9" align=center|Political Party
!style="background-color:#E9E9E9" |Seats won
|-
| 
|align="left"|Shiromani Akali Dal||75
|-
| 
|align="left"|Bharatiya Janata Party||18
|-
| 
|align="left"|Indian National Congress||14
|-
| 
|align="left"|Communist Party of India||2
|-
| 
|align="left"|Bahujan Samaj Party||1
|-
| 
|align="left"|Shiromani Akali Dal (M)||1
|-
| 
|align="left"|Independents||6
|-
|
|align="left"|Total||117
|-
|}

Members of Legislative Assembly

References

11th
1997 establishments in Punjab, India